Tevin Alexander Falzon (born November 19, 1992) is a Maltese-American professional basketball player for Pallacanestro Palestrina of the Italian Serie B Basket. He played college basketball for the Sacred Heart Pioneers. He is also a member of the Maltese national team.

College career
Falzon played for the Sacred Heart Pioneers men's basketball team from 2012 to 2016. During his senior season. he averaged 10.9 points, 8.3 rebounds, 1.5 assists and 1.4 blocks per game. He led the Pioneers in rebounds and blocks in each of his last two seasons.

Professional career
In January 2017, Falzon signed with Zornotza ST of the Spanish LEB Plata. With him, Zornotza reached the playoff finals of the league, before losing out to Valladolid.

After his stint in Spain, he joined Cheshire Phoenix of the British Basketball League (BBL).  He appeared in 32 regular season games for the Phoenix, averaging 5.8 points and 3.6 rebounds per game. In January 2018, he played a pivotal role in helping Cheshire to their first BBL Cup title in franchise history, scoring 12 points in the Cup final. He stayed in the BBL the following season, signing with the Bristol Flyers. In 33 regular season games for the Flyers, including 17 starts, Falzon averaged 8.6 points and 6.4 assists per game.

In January 2020, Falzon signed with Úrvalsdeild karla club Njarðvík where he met his former Sacred Heart teammate, Mario Matasovic. In his debut on January 5, Falzon had 4 points and 5 rebounds. He was released by Njarðvík after 4 games where he averaged 5.0 points and 2.3 rebounds. On September 2, 2020, Falzon signed with Pallacanestro Palestrina of the Serie B Basket.

National team career
Falzon represented Malta in the 2014 FIBA European Championship for Small Countries. During the 2018 FIBA European Championship for Small Countries, Falzon averaged 14.8 points and 7.8 rebounds for the Maltese national team, helping them finish first in the tournament.

Personal life
Tevin's younger brother is basketball player Aaron Falzon.

References

External links
Professional statistics @ proballers.com
College statistics @ basketball reference.com
Sacred Heart Pioneers bio
Icelandic League statistics

1992 births
Living people
American men's basketball players
Basketball players from Massachusetts
Bristol Flyers players
Cheshire Phoenix players
Maltese men's basketball players
Power forwards (basketball)
Sacred Heart Pioneers men's basketball players
Sportspeople from Newton, Massachusetts